Andreas Schön (born 9 August 1989) is a German professional footballer who plays as an attacking midfielder for FC Astoria Walldorf.

External links
 
 

1989 births
Living people
German footballers
Association football midfielders
TSG 1899 Hoffenheim II players
VfR Aalen players
SV Werder Bremen II players
FC Astoria Walldorf players
3. Liga players
Regionalliga players
Sportspeople from Heidelberg
Footballers from Baden-Württemberg